Giovanni Battista del Tasso (1500–1555) was an Italian architect and sculptor.

1500 births
1555 deaths
Sculptors from Florence
Italian male sculptors
Architects from Florence